"Tu trouveras" (English translation: "You Will Find") is the name of a 2002 song recorded by the Canadian singer Natasha St-Pier, composed by Pascal Obispo and written by Lionel Florence.

It was released as the first single from her third album, De l'amour le mieux, on which it features as first track. The song became a top three hit in France and Belgium (Wallonia) and was much aired on radio, remaining to date St-Pier's most successful single in terms of sales.

Song information
The music was written by famous composer Lionel Florence, and composed by French singer Pascal Obispo who also participated in the production of the song. It deals with a love relationship in which St-Pier admits her mistakes and her weaknesses. The words "Tu trouveras", which are sung in the refrain, are performed by Pascal Obispo, and therefore the song is generally considered as a duet, even though almost all of the lyrics are sung by Natasha St.-Pier. They performed the song in many French TV programs.

The song features on many French compilations, such as Les Plus Belles Ballades, Les Plus Beaux Duos, Non Stop Hits 4, Les Plus Belles Voix, vol. 1, Hitbox 2002 Best of, vol. 4 and Hit de diamant.

Christophe Maé covered the song included in a medley named "Mister Restos 2008" on Les Enfoirés' 2008 album Le Secret des Enfoirés.

Chart performances
In France, the single started at number four on 30 March 2002 and peaked at number three in its third week. It was blocked from topping the chart by Shakira's "Whenever, Wherever" and Jean-Pascal Lacoste's "L'Agitateur". It remaining for 18 consecutive weeks in the top ten and 25 weeks in the top 50. Then it dropped quickly and fell off the chart after 27 weeks. It was awarded Platinum disc by the SNEP, the French certifier and was sixth on the Annual Chart. As of August 2014, it was the 42nd best-selling single of the 21st century in France, with 441,000 units sold.

It was the more aired song of 2002 in France, with 14,957 broadcastings and 1.2 billion contacts. Yacast, which established the official airplay charts in France, revealed that the song was the more aired on five radio stations: Alouette, Champagne MF, Hit West, Kiss FM and Scoop.

In Belgium (Wallonia), "Tu trouveras" entered the chart at number 14 on 30 March, jumped to a peak of number three where it stayed for four consecutive weeks. It remained for 12 weeks in the top five, dropped slowly on the chart and totaled 20 weeks in the top 20 and 31 weeks on the chart. It was the seventh best-selling single of the year and achieved Platinum status.

In Switzerland, the single achieved moderate success, peaking at number 20 in the third week, on 5 May 2002. It remained for seven weeks in the top 50 and nine weeks in the top 100.

In 2003, St-Pier did a version in Spanish, "Encontrarás" with the Spanish singer Miguel Bosé, and reached number one on the Spanish Singles Chart and number two in Los 40 principales Chart.

Track listing
 CD single
 "Tu trouveras" — 3:26
 "Les Diamants sont solitaires" — 4:27

Charts and sales

Peak positions

Year-end charts

Certifications and sales

References

2002 singles
Natasha St-Pier songs
Pop ballads
Songs with music by Pascal Obispo
Songs written by Lionel Florence